= Butterfly Peace Garden =

Sri Lankan non-governmental organization

The Butterfly Peace Garden (BPG) is a non-governmental organization established in Batticaloa, Sri Lanka in 1996. Since that time the BPG has provided counseling and support to children traumatized by civil conflict in the region. In late 2004 the BPG also became a centre for helping victims of the tsunami which devastated the Batticaloa area. The BPG and its staff have been supported by a variety of local and international agencies and charities, including the governments of Canada and the Netherlands, WarChild International and Ashoka International, which named BPG co-founder Paul Hogan a fellow in 2003.

Children are brought to the BPG each day from surrounding villages in groups that are mixed with respect to gender and ethnicity (e.g. children from Tamil and Muslim villages). A typical program cycle runs one day a week for nine months and involves activities drawn from a range of visual, dramatic and musical arts. Activities are conducted by adult animators skilled in one or more artistic discipline, who have in many cases experienced psychological wounds similar to those of the children who come to the BPG. The BPG has for several years served as a model for innovative and effective programs for war-affected children, families and communities.
